Abovyan Street, is a street at the central Kentron district of the Armenian capital Yerevan. It was known as Astafyan Street between 1868 and 1920.

The street runs from the central Republic Square to the statue of prominent Armenian writer Khachatur Abovian (1809–1848), who the street is named after. Abovyan Street is the first planned street of the Armenian capital.

Located at downtown Yerevan, Abovyan Street is mainly home to cultural and educational institutions, luxurious residential buildings, elite brand shops, commercial offices, coffee shops, hotels, restaurants and night clubs.

History
In 1855, the Russian viceroy of Caucasus confirmed the planning of Yerevan streets. The average width of the streets was planned to be from 6 to 20 meters. Astafayan Street was planned to be 20 meters wide. Astafyan was the first street in Yerevan that was built according to a certain plan. It was opened in 1863 and was named Astafyan after Mikhail Astafyev, the governor of the Erivan Governorate from 1860 to 1862. 

The street was officially called Astafyevskaya, but the residents of Yerevan called it in their way – changing the suffix "-yevskaya" to "-yan". That was the main reason why it was known as Astafyan, not Astafyevskaya. In 1904, the horsecar system began to be constructed on Abovyan Street and was completed in 1906. It only operated 12 years, until 1918. The first tram in Yerevan passed on Abovyan Street in 1933.

Notable buildings
Arno Babajanyan concert hall,
Grand Hotel Yerevan,
The Alexander, a Luxury Collection Hotel,
Ibis Yerevan Center,
Artists' Union of Armenia,
Moscow Cinema,
Stanislavski Russian Theatre of Yerevan,
The churches of Katoghike and Surp Anna,
Yerevan State Medical University,

Shops
Abovyan Street is home to a number of luxury fashion brands including: Cop-Copine, Etam, Mango, Mexx, Motivi, Nougat London, Okaïdi, Olsen, Promod and Sinéquanone.

Gallery

References

External links
History of Abovyan Street

Transport in Yerevan
Roads in Armenia
Streets in Yerevan